Bernicat is a surname. Notable people with the surname include:

 Firmin Bernicat (1842–1883), French operetta composer
 Marcia Bernicat (born 1953), American diplomat